Tiffany Marie Boshers (born December 1, 1982) is an American soccer player. She played for the Newcastle Jets in the Australian W-League from 2012–2013.

Playing career

Baylor University, 2001–2005 
Boshers attended Baylor University from 2001 to 2005 where she played for the Baylor Bears.

Newscastle Jets, 2012–2013
Boshers signed with the  Newcastle Jets in 2013. She made her debut for the team during a match against Sydney on October 21, 2012. During the 2012–13 W-League season, she made ten appearances for Newcastle. The team finished in seventh place with a  record.

See also 

 List of foreign W-League (Australia) players

References

Further reading
 Grainey, Timothy (2012), Beyond Bend It Like Beckham: The Global Phenomenon of Women's Soccer, University of Nebraska Press, 
 Stewart, Barbara (2012), Women's Soccer: The Passionate Game, Greystone Books,

External links
 Baylor player profile

1982 births
Living people
American women's soccer players
Newcastle Jets FC (A-League Women) players
A-League Women players
Women's association football midfielders
Baylor Bears women's soccer players
Soccer players from California
Soccer players from Illinois
People from Sun Valley, Los Angeles